George Alton Harold (born April 13, 1942) is a former American football defensive back in the National Football League for the Baltimore Colts and the Washington Redskins.  He played college football at Allen University and was drafted in the tenth round of the 1965 NFL Draft.

1942 births
Living people
Players of American football from Augusta, Georgia
American football defensive backs
Allen Yellow Jackets football players
Allen University alumni
Baltimore Colts players
Washington Redskins players